Liu Guobao (born 30 April 2003) is a Chinese footballer who currently plays as a midfielder for Chinese Super League side Shandong Taishan.

Club career
A native to Beijing, along with his older brother Liu Guobo he would leave his hometown to pursue his football development, initially joining Shanghai Lucky Star before settling at the Shandong Taishan's youth team. While his brother returned to Beijing to start his professional career, Liu Guobao reluctantly developed and graduated through the Shandong youth system at the start of the 2021 Chinese Super League season. He would on to be loaned on to third tier club Xi'an Wolves on 5 July 2021. On his return to Shandong, Lin would be included in a youth team squad to participate in the 2022 AFC Champions League as the senior team were unable to participate, due to the strict Chinese COVID-19 quarantine regulations.

Career statistics
.

References

External links

2003 births
Living people
Chinese footballers
Shandong Taishan F.C. players